The Huerta de la Alcurnia was a Moorish garden in medieval Islamic Toledo, in Al-Andalus, present day Spain. Its name is derived from the Arabic Munya al-kudya, meaning 'garden on a higher ground.'

Design
The Huerta de la Alcurnia was on the river bank between the southern city walls and the Tagus River.  The garden had a pavilion for Al-Mamun, the king of the Taifa of Toledo. In the 11th century the garden was, possibly, the location of a water clock of the mathemacian al-Zarqālī, which was said to be between the "Bab-al-Dabbagin" also known by its Spanish name as "Puerta de los Curtidores" (English translation: gate of the tanners) and the Tagus.

Etching
A clear image of the garden is to be found on an etching of a view of Toledo from 1585 by Ambrogio Brambilla (f. 1585-99) ed. by Pietro de Nobili (dativus: Nobilibus), available on Bibliotheca Digital Hispánica

See also
Palacio de Galiana
Spanish gardens
:Category:Garden design history of Spain

References

External links
Middle East Garden Traditions - see Toledo (7), third paragraph.
Biblioteca Digital, Toledo Map, Vistas de ciudades 1650-1700 - (scroll to the bottom)

Gardens in Spain
Culture of Al-Andalus
Buildings and structures in Toledo, Spain